Custom Coasters International (CCI) was one of the premier wooden roller coaster manufacturers in the world and produced 34 wooden coasters in eleven years — more than any other company in recent times. It was located in West Chester, Ohio.

History
Custom Coasters Incorporated opened its doors on September 1, 1991. The company was founded by Denise Dinn-Larrick, the daughter of coaster designer Charles Dinn — founder of the Dinn Corporation, her brother Jeff Dinn and her husband Randy Larrick. The original designers for the company included freelance design engineers Mike Boodley and Bill Kelley of California. Larry Bill, formerly with Curtis D. Summers & Associates joined the design team in 1992. Initially the company promoted small, affordable, family coasters but eventually progressed to larger models known for their speed and intensity. Once the company started working with international clients the name was changed in November 1994 to Custom Coasters International.

CCI filed for bankruptcy in 2002 while still building the New Mexico Rattler at Cliff's Amusement Park. Cliff's was left with a partially completed coaster and quickly hired the construction crew and completed the ride themselves. No attempt was made to reorganize the company and Denise Dinn, who by then had been divorced from Randy Larrick, filed for Chapter 7 bankruptcy which resulted in liquidation of the company's assets. Denise Dinn was hired by S&S Power to start a new wooden coaster division for that company. Four coasters were produced before that division was closed. Four of the designers for CCI (Larry Bill, Chad Miller, Korey Kiepert, and Michael Graham) founded The Gravity Group in 2002. Other coaster designers Bill Kelley, Dennis McNulty and Mike Boodley left CCI years before the company went bankrupt. Mike Boodley started Great Coasters International in 1994, Dennis McNulty returned to civil engineering in 1999 and Bill Kelley currently works for Dynamic Designs, Inc.

List of roller coasters

Over the span of 11 years, Custom Coasters International had built 34 roller coasters around the world. As of 2019, 29 continue to operate, one is closed, two have been demolished, and two have been converted to steel roller coasters (Medusa to Medusa Steel Coaster and Twisted Twins to Storm Chaser) by Rocky Mountain Construction.

The roller coasters in the following table are listed in order of installation.

References

External links

The Gravity Group
S&S Sansei

Roller coaster manufacturers
Manufacturing companies established in 1991
Manufacturing companies disestablished in 2002
1991 establishments in Ohio
2002 disestablishments in Ohio
Bankrupt companies of the United States
Defunct manufacturing companies based in Ohio